Handi Hamzah (born 20 December 1982) is an Indonesian footballer who currently plays for PSM Makassar in the Indonesia Premier League.

Club statistics

References

External links

1982 births
Association football defenders
Living people
Indonesian footballers
Liga 1 (Indonesia) players
Bontang F.C. players
Persiba Balikpapan players
PSM Makassar players